Beclamide (marketed as Chloracon, Hibicon, Posedrine, Nydrane, Seclar, and other names) is a drug that possesses anticonvulsant activity.  It is no longer used.

Uses
It has been used as a sedative and as an anticonvulsant.

It was studied in the 1950s for its anticonvulsant properties, as a treatment for generalised tonic-clonic seizures. It was not effective for absence seizures.

Interest in the drug resumed in the 1990s for its psychiatric properties as an adjunct in the treatment of schizophrenia.

Side effects
Side effects are uncommon but include stomach pain, nervousness, giddiness, skin rash and leukopenia. It is counter-indicated in breast feeding as it is passed in the milk.

Administration and pharmacology
Administration is oral, though it has an unpleasant taste. It is quickly absorbed and elimination is renal and complete within 48 hours. Beclamide is possibly metabolized to 3-chloropropanoic acid in vivo, which binds to the GHB receptor.

References

 The Medical Treatment of Epilepsy by Stanley R Resor. Published by Marcel Dekker (1991). .

Abandoned drugs
Anticonvulsants
Carboxamides
Organochlorides